Tumbu refers to:

 Junior Tumbu, nickname for Lamin Conteh (b. 1976), retired Sierra Leonean international footballer
 Tumbu, a cultivar of Karuka
 Tumbu fly (Cordylobia anthropophaga) a species of blow fly
 Tumbu liquor, another name for palm wine
 Tumbu, Sierra Leone, a settlement